Morpho lympharis, the Lympharis morpho, is a Neotropical butterfly found in Peru and Bolivia.

Description
Morpho lympharis is a large butterfly. The crystal-clear wings are suffused blue or iridescent pink. The reverse side is decorated with a row of ocelli.

Morpho lympharis replaces M. portis in the Andean region, but has hitherto only been found in Peru and was described from Paucartambo Province. The male above somewhat darker blue than M. aega and with subapical white punctiform spots on the forewing. Underside of both wings with three ocelli, of which the apical and the two intermediate ones are elongate-oval in shape. Otherwise as M. portis.

Taxonomy
Blandin (1993), considers Morpho lympharis conspecific with Morpho sulkowskyi and that it is one of a north-south succession of subspecies spread from Colombia to Bolivia. Lamas (2004) considers that there are two species, M. sulkowskyi ranging from Colombia to central Peru, and M. lympharis, ranging from central Peru to Bolivia.

Habitat
Morpho sulkowskyi and Morpho lympharis uniquely occupy Tropical Andes cloud forests, at altitudes between 1500 and 3500 m.

References

Le Moult (E.) & Réal (P.), 1962-1963. Les Morpho d'Amérique du Sud et Centrale, Editions du cabinet entomologique E. Le Moult, Paris.

External links
"Morpho Fabricius, 1807" at Markku Savela's Lepidoptera and Some Other Life Forms showing taxonomy and subspecies
Butterflies of America Images of type and other specimens.

Morpho
Nymphalidae of South America
Butterflies described in 1873
Taxa named by Arthur Gardiner Butler